The Shamsīyah were a tribe or sect of sun-worshippers in northern Mesopotamia, concentrated in the city of Mardin (in modern south-eastern Turkey) and the surrounding Tur Abdin region. They may have been adherents of a late version of the ancient Mesopotamian religion, particularly the cult of the ancient Mesopotamian solar deity Shamash. The Shamsīyah converted to the Syriac Orthodox Church in the 17th century in order to avoid persecution in the Ottoman Empire but retained their own set of beliefs and practices; many travellers who observed and met with them doubted the extent to which they were actually Christian. There were still about a hundred families who identified as Shamsīyah in Mardin in the early 20th century but they appear to have since disappeared.

Terminology 
Shamsīyah means "sun-people" or "sons of the sun". Various alternate transliterations and anglicizations of the name have been used through the centuries, including Shamsi, Shamsiyya, Chamsi, Schemsîe, Shemsiye, Shemsi, Shemsy, Shemshi, Shemseeah, and Shemshiehs. The name did not originate as a self-identity, instead being imposed on the Shamsīyah by adherents of the Syriac Orthodox Church. The name derives from the Arabic word Al-Shams (الشمس, "the sun"). The Armenian inhabitants of Mardin and surrounding settlements called adherents of the sect Arevortik, also meaning "sons of the sun".

The native language used by the Shamsīyah themselves is not known since they spoke different languages and claimed different ethnic origins depending on the ethnicity of the person they spoke with. They have variously been suggested to have been Assyrians, Armenians, Yazidis, or even Oghuz Turks, among other hypotheses. The Shamsīyah were unwilling to intermarry with other religious groups and considered themselves distinct.

History

Origin 

According to the Assyriologist Simo Parpola, the Shamsīyah were possibly the last known adherents of a late version of the ancient Mesopotamian religion, an ancient set of beliefs thought to have first formed in Mesopotamia in the sixth millennium BC. Mesopotamia was largely Christian by the third century AD. The sun god Shamash (also called Utu in Sumerian) is recorded in ancient Mesopotamian sources from the earliest periods and his cult was particularly strong in Syria and northern Mesopotamia; many early churches in the region were repurposed pagan sun-temples (like churches, these faced east towards the rising sun). The important Syriac Orthodox monastery Mor Hananyo, located near Mardin, was built on top of an ancient temple dedicated to Shamash. The present inhabitants of the region connect the builders of the ancient sun-temples to the later Shamsīyah. 

In addition to ancient Mesopotamian beliefs, the Shamsīyah may have been influenced by Yazidism (Yazidis also pray facing the sun) and perhaps Gnosticism and Zoroastrianism. The Shamsīyah might have been connected to the "Sabians" of Harran, another poorly understood Mesopotamian sect active in the early Middle Ages; the Harran Sabians have also been suggested to have been adherents of the ancient Mesopotamian religion. Armenian records mention the Shamsīyah being known from at least the fifth century AD onwards. 15th-century Syriac-language sources suggest that significant numbers of the converted and were welcomed into the Syriac Orthodox Church already in the sixth century AD. A group of sun- or fire-worshippers living in the city of Samsat, perhaps connected to the Shamsīyah, were reported by the Catholicos Nerses IV the Gracious to have converted to Christianity in the 12th century. Coins minted in Mardin in the Middle Ages during the city's rule by the Turkish Artuqid dynasty and the Mongol Empire are noted for prominently incorporating solar iconography, both in the form of the Lion and Sun emblem but also in the form of just the sun alone.

Conversion to Christianity 
Though the Shamsīyah, or adherents of similar beliefs, had previously been numerous in the northern lands around the Tigris river, they were by the 17th century mainly confined to Mardin. They had a separate cemetery and their own quarters in the city. The Shamsīyah apparently congregated in a temple located in the vicinity of the city gate, remnants of which survived until recent times. Since the Shamsīyah were few in number, they long remained largely unnoticed to the outside world. They first came to the attention of the government of the Ottoman Empire when Sultan Murad IV passed through Mardin on his way back following the 1638 capture of Baghdad. The sultan noted that Mardin was home to about hundred families of sun-worshippers, based on tax records about four hundred people. Under Islamic law, followers of religions not among those of the People of the Book (Islam, Christianity, Judaism and Sabians) are condemned to choose conversion, exile or death. Since the Shamsīyah freely admitted to the sultan that they were not People by the Book, Murad ordered them all to be executed. The Syriac Orthodox patriarch, Ignatius Hidayat Allah, however took pity on them and agreed to baptize the Shamsīyah to safeguard them from execution and persecution. Although they were from that point on considered to be Christians and outwardly conformed to Syriac Orthodox beliefs and practices, they kept their old name and continued some of their own pre-Christian traditions.

Many Shamsīyah who did not wish to convert reportedly also fled to Iran or other settlements in the surrounding Tur Abdin region. According to the missionary Giuseppe Campanile, writing in 1818, the Shamsīyah converted only for protection and abandoned all Christian practices after Murad left the city, only actually adopting them in 1763 under pressure from the Syriac Orthodox and bribed government officials.

Contact with travellers 

The Venetian traveller Ambrosio Bembo, who passed through the Ottoman Empire in 1671–1675, noted the presence of five different Christian sects in the city of Diyarbakır (located near Mardin). Among them were the Shamsīyah, who Bembo wrote "were, and still are, worshippers of the sun". The Shamsīyah were considered by the French author Michel Febvre in 1675 to be one of the "fourteen nations" of the Ottoman Empire. Febvre classified them among various "heretical" eastern Christian groups and noted that they had only recently converted from paganism. The German explorer Carsten Niebuhr passed through Mardin in 1766 and noted the presence of the Shamsīyah there. Niebuhr spoke with an old man belonging to the group, who claimed that many of the villages in Tur Abdin had in his youth adhered to their religion but that they by this point were limited to only about a hundred families living in two districts in Mardin and they nominally adhered to the Syriac Orthodox Church. Niebuhr concluded based on the practices he observed that the Shamsīyah were probably adherents of a remnant of the pre-Christian religion in the region.

The Anglican missionary Joseph Wolff, who passed through Mardin in 1824, noted that the Shamsīyah told him that they worshipped "the sun, the moon, and the stars" and that the sun was "their malech, their king"; based on phonetic comparisons Wolff came to the bizarre conclusion that they were idolaters who worshipped the god Moloch. Wolff also noted that they although they dressed like Syriac Christians, they did not intermarry with other members of the Syriac Orthodox Church. According to the British author James Silk Buckingham, the Shamsīyah in 1827 remained "quite distinct, both in belief and practice" and were still sometimes observed to rever the sun. Silk Buckingham claimed that they by this time encompassed about a thousand families. The Austrian historian Joseph von Hammer-Purgstall still considered the Shamsīyah to "worship only the sun" in 1836. The American missionary Horatio Southgate visited the Shamsīyah in the hills surrounding Mardin in 1837. Southgate reported that they at this time called themselves "sons of Ishmael", though he believed this was only to evade the suspicion of the Ottoman authorities.

Disappearance 
When the Guyanese bishop Oswald Parry visited Mardin in 1897 he claimed to have found no trace of the Shamsīyah. Contrary to Parry's report, the British priest and scholar Adrian Fortescue claimed in 1913 that there were still about a hundred families who identified as Shamsīyah in Mardin. Fortescue also doubted the extent to which the Shamsīyah had actually adopted Christianity, referring to them as "a curious group of semi-Christian Jacobites who were once sun-worshippers". They still lived in Mardin at the outbreak of World War I but their subsequent fate is unknown and they appear to have since disappeared, perhaps merging into the rest of the Syriac Orthodox Church. According to Yazidi records, there were still Shamsīyah living in the region in the 1950s and 1960s who were persuaded by Tahseen Said, the Mîr of the Yazidis, to convert to Yazidism.

Practices 
Beyond the fact that the Shamsīyah worshipped the sun, little certain is known of their traditions and practices due to their own unwillingness to disclose them. Much of what little has been written of their practices is unconfirmed and appears to derive from second-hand sources rather than from direct observation. Simeon, a Polish traveller who visited Mardin in the early 17th century, claimed that the Shamsīyah gathered in their own temple every Saturday night to pray and hold incestuous orgies; an unlikely claim probably based on prejudices against Eastern religions. According to Febvre in 1675, the Shamsīyah after their conversion adopted the Syriac Orthodox practices of baptisms and burial ceremonies, but kept their own sun-worshipping practices as well, which they performed in secret assemblies. 

Niebuhr apparently observed several distinct practices in 1766, including that the Shamsīyah built "the most elegant doors in their house always facing the sunrise", that the prayed facing the sun, and that they pulled the hair from their dead and put a pair of coins in their mouths. Niebuhr also wrote that their weddings were officiated by Syriac Orthodox priests but that the newlyweds after the ceremony were given a ride down a road, passing by a "certain large stone to which they must show great respect". The pulling of hair was also reported by Campanile in 1818, who wrote that they shaved of the beard, hair and body hair of those who were near death since they believed that their sins were tied to their hairs. Campanile also reported on the dead being buried with gold and silver jewellery alongside household belongings.

Campanile further claimed in 1818 that the Shamsīyah also venerated cows and that they three times a year met to construct a large idol in the shape of a lamb, which they put in a bowl and performed various acts in front of, such as prayer, adoration and kissing the idol. Silk Buckingham wrote in 1827 that the Shamsīyah had refused to give information on their beliefs to other members of the Syriac Orthodox Church and threatened their adherents with death if they did so. According to Silk Buckingham, the Shamsīyah were observed as showing reverence to the sun through removing their turbans during sunrises. Southgate wrote in 1837 that the Shamsīyah by his time were still said to perform their "ancient rites" but did not himself observe any of the practices noted by previous travellers.

Notes

References 

Mesopotamian religion
Mardin
Tur Abdin
Religion in the Ottoman Empire